King Brothers was an Australian bus company operating route and school services in the Great Lakes and Mid North Coast regions of New South Wales. It collapsed in April 2003 with debts of $220 million, after owners Peter and Tony King were charged with and later convicted of fraud.

History
J&L King was a small family bus operator with route and school services between Kempsey and Crescent Head. It also operated a used bus dealership. In February 1991 it purchased the school services of Argent's. At some stage it operated a Port Macquarie to Tamworth service that was sold in 1996.

After control passed to twin sons Tony and Peter, in the late 1990s / early 2000s King Brothers expanded rapidly with the acquisition of a number of operators in the Great Lakes and Mid North Coast regions including:
Coffs Harbour Bus Lines
Glynn's, Grafton
Grafton Bus Co
Grafton-Yamba Bus Service
Great Lakes Coaches, Bulahdelah & Heatherbrae
Joyce Valley Link, Urunga
Newman's Bus Service, Macksville 
Pell's Bus Service, Nambucca Heads
Port Macquarie Bus Service
Sonter's Bus Service, Laurieton

The business was put up for sale however in April 2003 the business collapsed with debts of $220 million after the owners were charged with, and later convicted of, having defrauded the National Australia Bank and Toyota Financial Services by selling and leasing back fictitious buses. The operation was sold by its administrator to Busways in September 2003.

Fleet
Prior to the expansion of the late 1990s, King's fleet turned over regularly as buses were run in and out of the fleet in quick succession as part of its dealership activities.  After the acquisitions it purchased over 60 new Mercedes-Benz and Renaults in 1999/2000. A silver with light green and pink livery was adopted.

References

Bus companies of New South Wales
Mid North Coast
Transport companies disestablished in 2003
Defunct bus companies of Australia
2003 disestablishments in Australia